Tullio Serafin (1 September 18782 February 1968) was an Italian conductor and former Musical Director at La Scala.

Biography
Tullio Serafin was a leading Italian opera conductor with a long career and a very broad repertoire who revived many 19th-century bel canto operas by Bellini, Rossini and Donizetti to become staples of 20th-century repertoire. He had an unparalleled reputation as a coach of young opera singers and famously harnessed and developed both Renata Tebaldi's and Maria Callas's considerable talents.

Born in Rottanova (Cavarzere), near Venice, and trained in Milan, he played viola in the Orchestra of La Scala, Milan under Arturo Toscanini, later being appointed Assistant Conductor.  He took over as Music Director at La Scala when Toscanini left to go to New York, and served 1909–1914, 1917–1918, and returned briefly after the Second World War, 1946 -1947.

He joined the conducting staff of the Metropolitan Opera in 1924, and remained for a decade, after which he became the artistic director of the Teatro Reale in Rome.  During his long career he helped further the careers of many important singers, including Rosa Ponselle, Magda Olivero, Joan Sutherland, Renata Tebaldi, and most notably Maria Callas, with whom he collaborated on many recordings.

Maestro Serafin was very appreciated in Buenos Aires. During 9 seasons at the Teatro Colón between 1914 and 1951, he conducted 368 opera performances of 63 different operas. This included many operas that are seldom performed, by composers such as Alfano, Catalani, Giordano, Massenet, Montemezzi, Monteverdi, Pizzetti, Respighi, Rimsky Korsakov, and Zandonai.

Serafin was instrumental in expanding the repertory, conducting the Italian premieres of works by Alban Berg, Paul Dukas, and Benjamin Britten.  He also conducted important world premieres by both Italian and American composers, such as Franco Alfano, Italo Montemezzi, Deems Taylor, and Howard Hanson. His goddaughter was the soprano Claudia Pinza Bozzolla.

Studio discography

Verdi Requiem (Caniglia, Stignani, Gigli, Pinza; 1939) EMI
 Un ballo in maschera (Caniglia, Barbieri, Gigli, Bechi; 1943) EMI
 Il barbiere di Siviglia (de los Ángeles, Monti, Bechi, Luise, Rossi-Lemeni; 1952) EMI
Lucia di Lammermoor (Callas, di Stefano, Gobbi, Arié; 1953) EMI
I puritani (Callas, di Stefano, Panerai, Rossi-Lemeni; 1953) EMI
Cavalleria rusticana (Callas, di Stefano, Panerai; 1953) EMI
Norma (Callas, Stignani, Filippeschi, Rossi-Lemeni; 1954) EMI
Pagliacci (Callas, di Stefano, Monti, Gobbi, Panerai; 1954) EMI
La forza del destino (Callas, Tucker, Tagliabue, Rossi-Lemeni; 1954) EMI
Aida (Callas, Barbieri, Tucker, Gobbi, Modesti, Zaccaria; 1955) EMI
Rigoletto (Callas, di Stefano, Gobbi, Zaccaria; 1955) EMI
 La traviata (Stella, di Stefano, Gobbi; 1955) EMI
 Linda di Chamounix (Stella, Valletti, Taddei, Barbieri, Capecchi, Modesti; 1956) Philips
 Moïse et Pharaon (Mancini, Danieli, Filippeschi, Lazzari, Taddei, Rossi-Lemeni, Clabassi; 1956) Philips
Turandot (Callas, Schwarzkopf, Fernandi, Zaccaria; 1957) EMI
Manon Lescaut (Callas, di Stefano, Fioravanti; 1957) EMI
Médée (Callas, Scotto, Pirazzini, Picchi, Modesti; 1957) Ricordi
 Suor Angelica (de los Ángeles, Barbieri; 1957) EMI
 Tosca (Stella, Poggi, Taddei; 1957) Philips

 L'elisir d'amore (Carteri, Alva, Panerai, Taddei; 1958) EMI
 Madama Butterfly (Tebaldi, Cossotto, Bergonzi, Sordello; 1958) Decca
 Mefistofele (Tebaldi, Danieli, del Monaco, Siepi; 1958) Decca
Lucia di Lammermoor (Callas, Tagliavini, Cappuccilli, Ładysz; 1959) EMI
La traviata (de los Angeles, Dal Monte, Sereni; 1959) EMI
 La bohème (Tebaldi, d'Angelo, Bergonzi, Bastianini, Siepi; 1959) Decca
 Cavalleria rusticana (Del Monaco, Simionato, McNeil, Satre, Di Stasio; 1959) Decca
Norma (Callas, Ludwig, Corelli, Zaccaria; 1960) EMI
Otello (Rysanek, Vickers, Gobbi; 1960) RCA Victor
 Il trovatore (Stella, Cossotto, Bergonzi, Bastianini; 1962) Deutsche Grammophon
 Isabeau (Pobbé, Ferraro, Rola; 1962) Cetra

References

Warrack, John and West, Ewan (1992), The Oxford Dictionary of Opera, 782 pages,  
Nicla Sguotti, Tullio Serafin, il custode del bel canto, Padova, Armelin Musica, 2014,  (https://web.archive.org/web/20150206232622/http://www.niclasguotti.it/tullio-serafin.html)

External links
[ AMG AllMusic entry]

1878 births
1968 deaths
Musicians from Venice
Italian male conductors (music)
Music directors (opera)
Conductors of the Metropolitan Opera
20th-century Italian conductors (music)
20th-century Italian male musicians